Millettia duchesnei is a large forest liana in the genus Millettia.

The rotenoids elliptol, 12-deoxo-12alpha-methoxyelliptone, 6-methoxy-6a,12a-dehydrodeguelin, 6a,12a-dehydrodeguelin, 6-hydroxy-6a,12a-dehydrodeguelin, 6-oxo-6a,12a-dehydrodeguelin, 12a-hydroxyelliptone and the flavanone eriodictyol can be isolated from the twigs of M. duchesnei.

References

External links

duchesnei
Taxa named by Émile Auguste Joseph De Wildeman